Lonicera × heckrottii, the golden flame honeysuckle, is a plant in the honeysuckle family, Caprifoliaceae, grown in gardens for its showy flowers and long season of bloom.

Description
Lonicera × heckrottii is a vine with opposite, simple leaves, on twining stems. They have fragrant pink to yellow flowers. Lonicera x heckrotti is believed to be a hybrid of Lonicera sempervirens and Lonicera x americana.

References

heckrottii
Hybrid plants